Griffin Butte, at  above sea level is a peak in the Smoky Mountains of Idaho. The peak is located in Sawtooth National Forest in Blaine County northwest of Ketchum. It is located in the watershed of the Big Wood River. No roads or trails go to the summit.

References 

Mountains of Blaine County, Idaho
Mountains of Idaho
Sawtooth National Forest